BE Semiconductor Industries N.V., simply called Besi, is a Dutch multinational company that designs and manufacturers semiconductor equipment. The company was founded in May, 1995 by Richard Blickman, who still leads the company today. The company employs 2040 people, of which 200 are at its headquarters in Duiven, a small town in the east of the Netherlands. It outsources production to its subsidiaries in China and Malaysia.

Besi is a publicly traded company, and its shares are listed on the Euronext Amsterdam stock market under the BESI ticker symbol. In 2021, Besi was valued at around $5.6 billion.

References

Semiconductor companies of the Netherlands
Multinational companies headquartered in the Netherlands